Viktor Aleksandrovich Borzykh (born 13 July 1996) is a Russian football player.

Club career
He made his debut in the Russian Professional Football League for FSK Dolgoprudny on 24 May 2015 in a game against FC Solyaris Moscow.

He made his Russian Football National League debut for FC Rotor Volgograd on 8 July 2017 in a game against FC Khimki.

References

External links
 Career summary by sportbox.ru

1996 births
Footballers from Moscow
Living people
Russian footballers
Association football forwards
FC Chernomorets Novorossiysk players
PFC CSKA Moscow players
FC Rotor Volgograd players
FC Chayka Peschanokopskoye players
FC Olimp-Dolgoprudny players
FC Mashuk-KMV Pyatigorsk players